Conus monachus, common name the monastic cone, is a species of sea snail, a marine gastropod mollusk in the family Conidae, the cone snails, cone shells or cones.

These snails are predatory and venomous. They are capable of "stinging" humans.

Description
The shell is a little inflated and distantly grooved below. The spire is striate and somewhat convex. The shell is white, longitudinally marbled and flecked with dull blue or purple. It captures it's prey by using the "taser-and-tether" (harpoon) strategy. This means it stuns its prey by using venom and extends a proboscis from its rostrum and "hooks" the fish, the same way a harpoon would.

Distribution and habitat
This marine species occurs in the Indo-Pacific. It is found in the neritic zone and resides in muddy sand and under rocks.

References

Further reading

External links 
To World Register of Marine Species
Cone Shells - Knights of the Sea

monachus
Gastropods described in 1758
Taxa named by Carl Linnaeus